Revolutionary Socialists (in Swedish: Revolutionära Socialister) was a Trotskyist organisation in Sweden. RS was formed in 1987 through the merger of two groups originating from the Socialist League. In 1990 RS joined the Workers List.

Political parties established in 1987
Defunct communist parties in Sweden
Trotskyist organizations in Sweden
1987 establishments in Sweden
Political parties disestablished in 1990
1990 disestablishments in Sweden